Gulli (stylised as gulli) is a French free-to-air television channel focused on kids programming for those aged 3 to 14. It was created as a result of a partnership between Lagardère Active and state-owned broadcaster France Télévisions. In 2019, the M6 Group bought Gulli as well as the television division of the Lagardère Active Group.

History
The channel was launched on 18 November 2005 on the digital terrestrial television platform in France. Ten years later, on 1 July 2015, Gulli launched its own HD simulcast feed on the Astra 1 satellite. On 5 April 2016, its HD feed is launched on DTT.

Gulli was created as a result of a partnership between a kids-television pioneer companies Lagardère Active and the state-owned France Télévisions. The former is known due to is children's network, Canal J, while the latter has a long history investing on kids programming through its youth-oriented division on France 3. On 23 December 2013, a deal was reached between Lagardère and France Télévisions to purchase the latter's shares in Gulli. The deal was finalised on 29 October 2014 with the transfer of 34% of France Télévisions's shares to Lagardère for €25 million.

The network has been launched in Russia, Africa, the MENA region, and Brazil, broadcasting in Russian, French, Arabic and Brazilian Portuguese.  The brand itself was sold alongside the rest of the Lagadère channels to Groupe M6 in 2019. The Russian feed utilizes the name "Gulli Girl" and broadcasts series aimed at a young female audience.

The channel has been launched in Brazil on August 9, 2020, on the newly established satellite TV provider BluTV, being the first expansion of the channel to the Americas.

Branding 
At the CSA hearings for the new DTT channels, the channel was presented under the name of Gulliver, named after Jonathan Swift's character Gulliver's Travels, before being renamed and shortened to Gulli.

On 8 April 2010, Gulli decided to use a new on-the-air branding designed by Gédéon. On the same occasion, the channel started modernising its logo, which has become darker, giving it volume and changing to 16/9 but somewhat dynamically, in the 4:3 and 16:9 aspect ratios.

A new branding, again designed by Gédéon, came in September 2013.

On 28 August 2017, Gulli changed its branding. This branding was made by 17MARS. This new branding received very positive reviews and gave a lot of colour to the channel.

Logos

Logos of derived channels

Slogans

Version 1 (2005 – 2010) 

 18 November 2005 to 26 September 2007: "Gulli, la chaîne des enfants sur la TNT."
 26 September 2007 to 26 December 2008: "Gulli, pour tous les yeux."
 26 December 2008 to 7 April 2010: "Gardez le contact !"

Version 2 (2010 – 2017) 

 7 April 2010 to 3 August 2013: "Gulli remue toute la famille !"
 3 August 2013 to 17 March 2014: "Gulli. Bienvenue dans la Famili !"
 17 March 2014 to 19 January 2018: "Avec Gulli, colore ta vie !"

Version 3 (2017–present) 

 19 January 2018 to 18 July 2020: "Gulli, Bienvenue dans la Famili."
 Since 18 July 2020: "Gulli, La chaîne préférée des enfants... gentils !"

Programming 
Gulli broadcasts cartoons, series, shows, and films.

Current

Live-action 

 Arthur à New York
 Chica vampiro
 Maggie & Bianca Fashion Friends
 Arnold et Willy
 Fort Boyard (Rebroadcast from France 2)
 In ze boîte
 Total Wipeout: Made in USA
 Power Rangers Ninja Steel
 Wazup
 Kally's Mashup

Movies
Un Moi Méprisable
Moi, Moche et Méchant 2
Moi, Moche et Méchant 3

Animated 
 Adventure Time (1 January 2016–present, also on Cartoon Network)
 Ariol (9 July 2019–present)
 Arthur and the Minimoys (22 December 2018–present)
 Baskup - Tony Parker (30 June 2018–present)
 Ben 10 (11 April 2017–present, Also on Cartoon Network (French TV channel))
 Beyblade Burst (28 August 2017 – 3 July 2018) 
 Bienvenue chez les Loud (2 September 2017 – 7 July 2018, 25 July 2018–present, Also on Nickelodeon)
 Blazing Team: Les maîtres du Yo Kwon Do (6 January 2018 – 14 October 2018)
 La Ferme en Folie (4 November 2013 – 11 September 2016, 26 August 2019–present)
 Boy, Girl, Etc. (23 May 2020 – present)
 Bunsen est une bête (22 December 2018–present)
 Foot 2 Rue extrême
 Fangbone (7 October 2017–present)
 Harvey Beaks (18 April 2016–present, Also on Nickelodeon (French TV channel))
 Hubert et Takako (2 May 2015 – 27 August 2017, 8 July 2018–present)
 Il était une fois... notre Terre
 Toõn Tetións (30 December 2004, - 20 September 2012 Repeats Of Ended series)
 Le Monde Incroyable de Gumball (24 December 2017–present, also on Cartoon Network.)
 Les Super Nanas (2016) (2017, Also on Cartoon Network) (not at this moment)
 Mes parrains sont magiques (14 February 2014 – 2017, 8 July 2018 – 16 May 2019, Also on Nickelodeon)
 Monster Buster Club 
 Mermaid Melody Pichi Pichi Pitch 
 My Little Pony: Pony Life (29 August 2020 – present)
 Objectif Blake! (2015–present)
 Oggy et les cafards (18 November 2005 – 31 May 2009, 30 June 2017–present) 
 Oggy et les cafards: Next Gen (7 November 2021 – present)
 Oscar & Co (July 2019–present)
 Rekkit (2 September 2014–present)
 Robocar Poli (Also on Piwi+)
 Roi Julian ! L’élu des lémurs
 Sonic Boom (30 August 2015–present)
 Super Wings (Also on TF1 and Piwi+)
 Thomas et ses amis
 Totally Spies!
 Transformers: Robots in Disguise: Mission secrète 
 Teletubbies (2015 version) 
 Winx Club (2012–present, Also on Nickelodeon)
 Corneil et Bernie (3 January 2009 – 17 December 2017, 6 January 2019–present)
 Yo-kai Watch (29 August 2016–present)
 Zig et Sharko (27 March 2016–present)

Gulli Prime
 Lego Masters USA (Le Meilleur Patissier Celebrites)
 The Great Video Party (La Grande Video Party)
 Renovation Island 
 The Best Celebirty Pastry Chef (LE MEILLEUR PÂTISSIER CÉLÉBRITÉS)
 Tiny Paradise: Mini Dream Houses (Tiny Paradise Mini maisons de reve)
 Tiny House Nation
 My Animals Make the Law (MON ANIMAL FAIT LA LOI)
 Domino Challenge 
 Suprise Renovation (RÉNOVATION SURPRISE)
 The Traitors (Les Traitres)
 Battlebots 
 Christmas, The favroite holiday that the French love (NOËL, LA FÊTE PRÉFÉRÉE DES FRANÇAIS)

Former

Animated

 Alien Bazar (30 August 2009 - 14 March 2016; 28 August 2017 - 28 December 2017)
 Atomic Betty (2011–2014)
 Les Baskerville (18 November 2005 - 30 March 2007)
 Bisounours (2010–2014)
 Creepie (30 August 2008 – 6 March 2009, 1 January 2010 – 2 July 2010)
 Disney's Doug (6 June 2006 – 19 December 2008)
 Donkey Kong Country (19 November 2005 – 17 November 2007)
 La Famille Pirate (1 July 2006 – 6 July 2017)
 Frog et Fou Furet (28 April 2010 - 13 July 2013)
 Foster, la maison des amis imaginaires (8 April 2010 – 23 February 2011) 
 Fish 'n Chips (5 November 2011 – 2014, 2017 – 31 August 2018)
 Johnny Test (3 November 2011 - 24 December 2018)
 Kitou Scrogneugneu (31 March 2007 - 26 December 2007; 12 January 2010 - 12 January 2011)
 La Panthère Rose (1 May 2008 – 25 December 2011)
 Mot (18 November 2005 - 5 May 2008; 3 April 2010 - 23 May 2010)
 Le Laboratoire de Dexter (8 April 2010 – 25 March 2012)
 Le Monde de Nina (1 January 2016 – 31 January 2016)
 Le Monde fou de Tex Avery (28 August 2010 – 11 June 2013)
 Le Secret de Sabrina (26 October 2009 – 7 February 2013)
 Le Woody Woodpecker Show (17 November 2008 – 27 December 2015) 
 Les Super Nanas ( 3 September 2011 – 20 November 2011) 
 Les Zinzins de l'espace (10 October 2006 – 31 December 2016; – the eve of 23 October 2017) 
 Toõn Tetións Gù! (8 September 2015, - 17 February 2017)
 My Little Pony Les amies c'est Magique ! (3 November 2011 – 6 December 2017, Now on TF1)
 Mermaid Melody: Pichi Pichi Pitch (2011–2016)
 Patrouille 03 (2 September 2006 - 12 April 2007; 12 November 2008 - 21 May 2009; 3 April 2010 - 4 April 2010)
 Ralf le Rat Record (2 September 2006 - 24 August 2008; 12 March 2010 - 31 December 2011) 
 Triple Z (1 September 2007 - 30 August 2011)
 Ratz (30 August 2008 – 14 December 2016) 
 Regal Academy, l'Académie Royale (Now on Nickelodeon Junior)
 Skunk Fu! (2007–2012)

Live-action
 Les gags de Trop fort l'Animal ! (2 September 2006 - 12 October 2013)

Programming blocks 
In September 2017, all the channel's program blocks (except Gulli Good and Doo) have been officially renamed by the channel.

Current 

 Gulli Good: The most watched shows as well as new shows. Airing at 4:30 pm on weekdays (5:15 pm until 2012). Until September 2009, the block was also aired on weekends, at the same hours as weekdays. Shows that aired in this block include with Pokémon, Power Rangers, and The Loud House. (Since 2 September 2006)
Gulli Doo: Preschool block with cartoons for little children. A former show in this block was Zig And Sharko. Airing weekdays morning at 8:30 am and at 12 pm. (Since 8 April 2010)
Gulli Go: Action-oriented cartoons. Aired weekends at 3 pm. Shows that aired in that block include Pokémon, Power Rangers, Transformers, and Beyblade: Metal Fusion. (Since 28 August 2017)
 Gulli Toon: Comedy/Funny/Humor oriented cartoons. Aired on weekdays at 7 am and 12 pm and also weekends at 5 pm. Shows that aired in this block include Oggy and the Cockroaches and Zig & Sharko. (Since 28 August 2017)
 Gulliwood: Cinema block that airs movies. Aired on Fridays nights at 7 pm (Since 28 August 2017)
Gulli Prime: block of programs for adults. Shows that aired in this block include The Thundermans, Mr. Bean, Tiny House Nation and Power Rangers. Daily from 9:05 pm to 1:45 am (since January 3, 2022).
Gulli Pop: Girl oriented cartoons. Aired weekends at 1:30 pm. Shows that aired in this block include My Little Pony, Barbie, The Thundermans, Lego Friends, The Powerpuff Girls and Totally Spies. (Since 28 August 2017)

Former 

 Boing: Block that aired Cartoon Network shows. Show that aired in this block include Dexter's Laboratory, Foster's: House of imaginary Friends and Codename: Kids Next Door. This block was created for promoting the launch of the Boing channel. (3 April 2010 to March 2012)
 Code Aventure: Action oriented block that aired shows like Pokémon. replaced by Gulli Go (from 19 November 2005 until 28 August 2017. Redesigned twice, once in 2006, the other in 2011).
 Girl Power: Programming series for girls between 7–11 years old. Aired on Wednesdays and weekends at 1:15 pm (until 28 August 2017).
 Gros Cartoon: Programming dedicated to the most popular (comedic) cartoons. Broadcast Les Ratz, Rudolf, La Famille Pirate and Les zinzins de l'Espace, as well as many others. Discontinued on 26 August 2012.
 GRRR!!!/grrr...: Programming dedicated to animals (Oggy and the Cockroaches, Ralf the Record Rat, Animaliens, Trop fort l'Animal and Woody Woodpecker). Aired in the morning (as grrr... at 6:35 am, stopped on 26 June 2010) and the afternoon (at 4:35 pm, stopped on 27 August 2012). The predominant color was blue in the morning and the predominant color in the afternoon was orange. In the morning, the animals were slightly less agitated than in the afternoon.
 Gulli Bang: Aired every Wednesday at 8:25 am and 4:25 pm, Saturday at 1:40 pm and Sunday at 8:25 am between 2012 and 2013. (Pet Alien, Pokemon)
 'Gulli Bonus': This block was the interstitials block. Aired in multiple parts of the day (most notably 20h00 and 10h45). From 2007 to 2021.
 Gulli d'or: A program broadcast on the channel's first anniversary on 18 November 2006. Broadcast Oggy and the Cockroaches, Grand Galop and more.
 Gulli Gang: Broadcast every day around 4:30 pm (stopped in September 2006) the most popular cartoon programming and news, like Oggy and the Cockroaches, Lil' Elvis Jones and the Truckstoppers and Mot. Replaced by GulliGood on 2 September 2006.
 Gulli Land: Cartoon programming about fantasy. Stopped in September 2008.
 Gulli Gulli: Broadcast in the morning after at 6:45 am (stopped in 2006 and replaced by grrr...). Aired shows like Donkey Kong, Mot, and Lil' Elvis Jones and the Truckstoppers. It returned in 2007 as part of the "rentrée" at 20h45, airing shows like Oggy and the Cockroaches, Mr. Bean and Intervilles Juniors.
 Home Cinéma: Broadcast in 2008 and stopped in 2010.
 La méteo de Gulli: Starred a monkey named Toobo who gives a forecast and dressing info. Stopped in the "rentrée" of 2013.
 La labo de Gulli: Aired Monday to Friday from 2 pm to 4 pm during the summer of 2007.
 Méchamment Drôle: Funny cartoon programming. Aired on weekends at 5 pm. Aired Zig and Sharko, Corneil and Bernie, A Kind of Magic, Oggy et les cafards and many more.
 Sitcomédies: Sitcom programming. Aired Monday to Friday at 12 pm (disappeared in 2007 and replaced by In ze boîte)
 Télé Grenadine: Cartoon programming of the 1970s and 80s. On Thursday evenings (formerly Tuesday evenings from 2007 to  September 2009) (Stopped in 2011). Aired Les Shadoks, Lucky Luke, and Calimero.
 Toon Party: The programs in this block are Lucky Luke, Woody Woodpecker, Pink Panther, Les Zinzins de l'Espace, Les Ratz etc. This event block was broadcast on New Year's Eve 2009 and in the summer 2012, Christmas 2012, and April 2013.
 Podium Gulli: Cartoon marathon that viewers could vote on gullitv.fr for broadcast on Saturday afternoon. From 2 September 2006 to 2 September 2009.
 Gulli Goal: Block of cartoons waiting for the World Cup. Broadcast every Saturday at 4 pm from 2 June 2018 and stopped in July of the same year after the victory of France.
 Gulli Club: Movie programming. Every Tuesday at 8:55 pm from 12 February 2019 and stopped the following spring after the channel starts broadcasting movies almost every night.

Broadcast hours

At the channel's launch on 18 November 2005, Gulli was broadcast from 6:30 am to 11:30 pm. From 10 December 2007 (about three months after the "rentrée" of 2007) to 31 August 2008, the channel broadcast from 6:00 am to 12:30 am. Since 1 September 2008, the channel broadcasts 24 hours a day, with a quick break from 6 am to 6:05 am. On some occasions before (or during) 2007, it would sleep at 10:45 pm.

International versions
Gulli Africa
Gulli Arabia
Gulli Bil Arabi
Gulli Brazil
Gulli Brasil
Gulli Girl (formerly Gulli Russia)

References

External links
 Official Gulli website—
 Official Gulli website—
 Official Gulli Girl website—
  Oggy and the Cockroaches's games on the former Gulli website in 2008.
 Former Gulli website- (Adobe Flash needed for functionality)
 Oggy et les cafards Sur Gulli Oggy and the Cockroaches on Gulli's official website (old)-

Children's television networks
Television stations in France
French-language television stations
Television channels and stations established in 2005
2005 establishments in France
Lagardère Active
France Télévisions